Frederick Wilfred Mobbs (29 July 1904 – 1979) was an English footballer who played in the Football League for Blackpool.

References

1904 births
1973 deaths
English footballers
Association football goalkeepers
English Football League players
Gainsborough Trinity F.C. players
Blackpool F.C. players
Aldershot F.C. players
Grantham Town F.C. players
Newark Town F.C. players